Steven McCleerey is an American politician and farmer who served as a member of the South Dakota House of Representatives for the first district. Elected in 2015, McCleerey previously served as Assistant House Democratic Leader.

Early life and education 
McCleerey was born and raised in Sisseton, South Dakota. He attended South Dakota State University, where he studied Agriculture.

Career 
Prior to entering politics, McCleerey worked as a grain farmer. McCleerey took office on December 13, 2015, and represents the first district with Republican Tamara St. John. McCleerey is a member of the South Dakota Democratic Party. He endorsed Hillary Clinton in the 2016 United States presidential election and Joe Biden in the 2020 United States presidential election. McCleerey is a member of the House Committee on Commerce and Energy, Military and Veterans Affairs, Retirement Laws, and State Affairs.

References 

Democratic Party members of the South Dakota House of Representatives
People from Sisseton, South Dakota
Farmers from South Dakota
American farmers
Year of birth missing (living people)
Living people
21st-century American politicians